Cristina Ortiz Rodríguez (19 March 1964 – 9 November 2016), better known as  ('Poisongirl'), was a Spanish singer, actress, sex worker, and media personality. Considered one of the most important and beloved LGBT icons in Spain, she rose to fame in 1996 after briefly appearing on the late-night talk show , broadcast on Telecinco between 1995 and 1997 and hosted by the journalist Pepe Navarro.

Distinguished for her spectacular appearance and profane humor, La Veneno was one of the first transgender women to become widely known in Spain, and has since been recognised as a pioneering trans icon. In 2020, a critically acclaimed series produced by Atresmedia following her life became a hit show in Spain.

Early life

La Veneno was born in Adra, Almería, the child  of José María Ortiz López (1930–2020) and María Jesús Rodríguez Rivera (born 1932). She noted from an early age that she was different from other children. She suffered aggression and abuse from people in her hometown and from her own family, who did not accept her gender identity. At age 13 she moved with one of her sisters to San Pedro de Alcántara, near Marbella with the Romero family after her parents kicked them both out of their house. There she worked as a farmer and a shop assistant as well as a hairdresser and a model.

Career

In 1991 she left Marbella for Spain's capital city, Madrid, where she worked as a hospital chef. That same year she appeared on the television dating show , which she won. The prize was a voyage to Bangkok alongside Charo, the partner she found on the show. There, in Thailand, she attended a  show where she realized that she was transgender. Thus, in 1992, she started her process of transition. There she was discovered in April 1996 by reporter Faela Saiz, who interviewed her for a TV feature on prostitution for the late-night show  on Telecinco. The interview, showcasing La Veneno's outrageous humour, was a hit. The show's host, Pepe Navarro, subsequently invited her to become a regular contributor. Her rise to fame was almost immediate, and she helped the programme reach viewing figures of almost eight million. The show ended in July 1997 after political conflicts surrounding the Alcàsser Girls crime and moved to Antena 3 under the name La sonrisa del pelícano.  ended in December 1997 after three months of broadcasting after numerous rumours that a sex tape starring journalist and entrepreneur Pedro J. Ramírez would be aired on television.

In 1996, La Veneno recorded two singles, "" and "", with the first one being gold-certified for selling over 50,000 copies, and her career as a vedette and a television personality took off. During the decade she toured Spain, performing in galas and making personal appearances at nightclubs and festivals. She also modeled for designers like Pepe Rubio and Antonio Alvarado. When  ended, she spent a month doing TV work in Buenos Aires, before returning to Spain and participating in other programmes for Telemadrid and Antena 3, among other channels. She also acted in six episodes of the series En plena forma, starring Alfredo Landa.

Prison term

In April 2003, Cristina was implicated in a case of arson and insurance fraud, and she was reported to the police by her then-boyfriend Andrea Petruzzelli. She was accused of intentionally setting fire to her flat in order to claim the insurance money. She was sent to an all-male prison as she hadn't changed her name to Cristina nor her gender in her identity papers. She claimed that her parents didn't even know that she had entered prison until she rang them after being sent to the Gregorio Marañón Hospital due to health issues in 2004.

Media coverage

Upon leaving prison, in 2006, she moved to Valencia with friend Paca la Piraña. That same year Cristina told the media that she had been raped and abused by the prison guards. This was disputed by the Spanish prison authorities. She openly spoke about her weight gain in prison as she reached 120 kg during her time in prison, and she was invited onto several television programmes, marking an apparent recovery of her career. In October 2010, the sensationalist Spanish TV show  challenged La Veneno to lose all the weight she had put on. By March 2011, La Veneno had lost 35 kg. It was subsequently revealed that she had been suffering from bulimia and severe depression, as well as suffering deep anxiety.

In August, she revealed that her ex-boyfriend had fled with all her savings, over 60,000 euros, and she was living on just €300 a month in benefits. In 2014 she was sent back to prison, this time a female prison, for eight months.

On 3 October 2016, she released a memoir titled  co-written by journalist Valeria Vegas.

Death

On November 5th 2016, Cristina had been found semi-conscious in her house, covered with bruises and with a deep wound to the head, which caused a traumatic brain injury. She was found there by her boyfriend, and there were bloodstains in her bathroom. She remained in intensive care. Cristina died four days later, on 9 November 2016. She had apparently taken a very large dose of Xanax tablets and alcohol. A second post mortem reached the same verdict.

While she was hospitalised in the ICU, people close to La Veneno speculated that the incident was not accidental, because she received death threats after the publication of her autobiography, which talked about affairs she had with powerful people. A week later, the plaque was stolen. In October 2020, the City Council of Madrid announced that the plaque would be replaced after many popular petitions were submitted. It was placed on 4 December.

In popular culture
The 2020 TV series Veneno is based on her life.

In March 2021 she was the theme of a tribute runway in a first season episode of Drag Race España. Later the same year, she was impersonated by Icesis Couture in the "Snatch Game" episode of the second season of Canada's Drag Race.

References

External links
 

1964 births
2016 deaths
Spanish vedettes
Spanish prostitutes
Transgender women
Spanish LGBT singers
LGBT memoirists
Transgender actresses
People from the Province of Almería
Accidental deaths from falls
Accidental deaths in Spain
20th-century Spanish actresses
Spanish television personalities
Women memoirists
Spanish LGBT writers
Spanish LGBT actors
Spanish women memoirists
Spanish memoirists
21st-century Spanish women writers